Girolamo Macchietti (c. 1535/1541-1592) was an Italian painter active in Florence, working in a Mannerist style.

Biography 
He was a pupil of Michele di Ridolfo. During the years 1556-1562, worked as an assistant to Giorgio Vasari in the decoration of the Palazzo Vecchio, where he worked with Mirabello Cavalori. He participated in the Vasari-directed decoration of the Studiolo of Francesco I with two canvases, one relating a Jason and Medea (1570) and the other a Baths of Pozzuoli (1572). He also painted an altarpiece on the Martyrdom of Saint Lawrence for Santa Maria Novella. In 1577, he completed a Gloria di San Lorenzo for Empoli Cathedral. He traveled to Rome and spent two years in Spain (1587–1589). No works are recorded from these travels.

Works 
 Pala Lioni, 1562–68, Florence, Villa Lioni-Michelozzi-Roti-Clavarino
 Epiphany, 1568, Florence, San Lorenzo
 Jason and Medea, 1570–72, Studiolo of Francesco I, Palazzo Vecchio, Florence
 The baths of Pozzuoli, 1570–72, Studiolo of Francesco I, Palazzo Vecchio, Florence
 Martyrdom of San Lorenzo, 1573, Santa Maria Novella, Florence
 Virgin's girdle,  1574, Santa Agata, Florence
 Apotheosis of San Lorenzo, 1577, Empoli Cathedral
 Allegory of Prudence, (Private Collection), traditionally attributed to Vasari until recently.
 Crucifixion, 1590, San Giovannino degli Scolopi, Florence

Bibliography 
 Raffaello Borghini, Il Riposo, 1584, p. 604.
 Michelangelo Buonarroti il Giovane, L'Ajone, favola narrativa burlesca, 1623.
 Francesco Del Furia, Di alcuni scritti di Michelangelo Buonarroti il Giovane, 1818, pp. 1, 66.
 Atti dell'imp e reale Accademia della Crusca, Florence, 1829, Vol.2, p. 79.

 Marta Privitera, Girolamo Macchietti tra Palazzo Vecchio e San Lorenzo, 1989.
 Marta Privitera, Girolamo Macchietti a Napoli, balls.
 Marta Privitera, Girolamo Macchietti: un pittore dello Studiolo di Francesco I (Firenze, 1535-1592), Jandi Sapi ed., 1996.
 The Grove Dictionary of Art, Macmillan Publishers (2000)
 Marta Privitera, Girolamo Macchietti, la Pala Lioni, in "Altomani 2004", n.1.
 Alessandro Nesi, Un quadro a Kiev e altre note su Girolamo Macchietti, in "Nuovi Studi" n.12, 2006, pp. 129–136, pic. 180.

External links

16th-century births
1592 deaths
16th-century Italian painters
Italian male painters
Painters from Florence
Italian Mannerist painters